Kampong Thom may refer to:

Kampong Thom city
Kampong Thom province, in Cambodia